Ahohite (a-ho'-hit )
is an epithet applied to the descendants of Ahoah, in particular:
 Dodo (father of Eleazar) (or Dodai), one of David's captains (I Chronicles 27:4)
 His son Eleazar, one of David's three mightiest heroes (II Samuel 23:9; I Chronicles 11:12)
 Zalmon, one of the thirty (II Samuel 23:28; I Chronicles 11:29).

References
"Ahohite" in the International Standard Bible Encyclopedia.

Hebrew Bible people
Epithets